Crassispira vezzaroi is a species of sea snail, a marine gastropod mollusk in the family Pseudomelatomidae.

Description
The length of the shell attains 10 mm.

Distribution
This marine species occurs off Balabac Island, Palawan, Philippines

References

 Cossignani T. (2014). Nuova Crassispira dalle Filippine. Malacologia Mostra Mondiale. 85: 33

External links
 

vezzaroi
Gastropods described in 2014